The Women's 100 metre individual medley competition of the 2014 FINA World Swimming Championships (25 m) was held on 4 December with the heats and the semifinals and 5 December with the final.

Records
Prior to the competition, the existing world and championship records were as follows.

The following records were established during the competition:

Results

Heats
The heats were held at 11:33.

Semifinals
The semifinals were held at 19:16.

Semifinal 1

Semifinal 2

Final
The final was held at 19:24.

References

Women's 100 metre individual medley
2014 in women's swimming